Saints Peter and Paul Catholic High School is a coeducational Roman Catholic secondary school and sixth form, located in Widnes in the English county of Cheshire.

It is a voluntary aided school administered by the Roman Catholic Archdiocese of Liverpool and Halton Borough Council.

History
The school opened in 1952 as Saints Joseph's Roman Catholic High School. It was initially a mixed sex secondary modern school but from 1959 education was provided separately for boys and girls. It returned to being a mixed sex school in 1972. It later merged with the neighbouring Sts John Fisher and Thomas More Roman Catholic High School to form Saints Peter and Paul Roman Catholic High School. Its current name is Saints Peter and Paul Catholic High School.

Academics
The school offers GCSEs and BTECs as programmes of study for pupils, while students in the sixth form have the option to study from a range of A Levels and further BTECs.

References

External links
Saints Peter and Paul Catholic High School official website

Secondary schools in the Borough of Halton
Widnes
Catholic secondary schools in the Archdiocese of Liverpool
Educational institutions established in 1952
1952 establishments in England
Voluntary aided schools in England